The 39th Directors Guild of America Awards, honoring the outstanding directorial achievements in film and television in 1986, were presented on March 7, 1987 at the Sheraton Premiere Hotel in Los Angeles and the nightclub 4D in New York. The feature film nominees were announced on January 28, 1987.

Winners and nominees

Film

Television

Commercials

D.W. Griffith Award
 Elia Kazan

Frank Capra Achievement Award
 Henry E. Brill

References

External links
 

Directors Guild of America Awards
1986 film awards
1986 television awards
Direct
Direct
Directors
1987 in Los Angeles
1987 in New York City
March 1987 events in the United States